

Maximilian Mayerl (28 May 1917 – 11 February 2010) was a fighter pilot in the Luftwaffe of Nazi Germany and recipient of the Knight's Cross of the Iron Cross  During his career Maximilian Mayerl was credited with 76 aerial victories in 600+ missions.

Awards and decorations
 Flugzeugführerabzeichen
 Front Flying Clasp of the Luftwaffe in Gold
 Ehrenpokal der Luftwaffe (29 June 1942)
 Iron Cross (1939)
 2nd Class
 1st Class
 Eastern Front Medal
 German Cross in Gold (27 November 1942)
 Knight's Cross of the Iron Cross on 22 November 1943 as Oberleutnant and Staffelkapitän of the 9./Jagdgeschwader 51 "Mölders"

References

Citations

Bibliography

 
 
 

1917 births
2010 deaths
Austrian military personnel of World War II
Luftwaffe pilots
German World War II flying aces
Recipients of the Gold German Cross
Recipients of the Knight's Cross of the Iron Cross
People from Liezen District